The Aviatik D.VII was a German prototype single-seater fighter aircraft of the First World War, designed by Aviatik. Built to participate in the Third D-Type Contest of October 1918, it saw no military service. The only real major change from the D.VI was a completely new horizontal and vertical tail design.

Specifications

References

D.VII